Cuddington is a civil parish in Cheshire West and Chester, England.  It contains 15 buildings that are recorded in the National Heritage List for England as designated listed buildings, all of which are listed at Grade II.  This grade is the lowest of the three gradings given to listed buildings and is applied to "buildings of national importance and special interest".  In the parish are two villages, Cuddington and Sandiway, which are contiguous.  The architect John Douglas was born in the village of Sandiway, and seven of the buildings in the list were designed by him, including the village church and its lychgate.

See also
Listed buildings in Crowton
Listed buildings in Hartford
Listed buildings in Norley
Listed buildings in Weaverham
Listed buildings in Whitegate and Marton
Listed buildings in Delamere

References
Notes

Citations

Sources

Listed buildings in Cheshire West and Chester
Lists of listed buildings in Cheshire